Loricaria cataphracta, sometimes known as the chocolate loricariid, is a species of catfish in the genus Loricaria and the family Loricariidae. It is native to South America, where it occurs in the Amazon River basin, as well as coastal rivers in the Guianas. It is known from Brazil, French Guiana, Guyana, Suriname, and Venezuela, where it is often seen in ponds. The species reaches 29.5 cm (11.6 inches) in standard length and is believed to be a facultative air-breather.

References

Loricariini
Taxa named by Carl Linnaeus
Fish described in 1758